Gyula Zilahy (22 January 1859, Zilah – 16 May 1938, Budapest) was a Hungarian stage and film actor. He co-directed several films with Alexander Korda in 1914-1915 including Korda's first film Watchhouse in the Carpathians. Zilahy was born as Gyula Balogh in 1859 in Zilah (today Zalău, Romania) and his career began in 1876. From 1880-84 he worked in Kolozsvár (today Cluj-Napoca, Romania), then in Debrecen (1885–87), and in Szeged (1888).

Selected filmography
Actor
 Pax vobiscum (1920)
 Stars of Eger (1923)
 The Csardas Princess (1927)
 Wine (1933)

Director
 Watchhouse in the Carpathians (1914)

Bibliography
 Kulik, Karol. Alexander Korda: The Man Who Could Work Miracles. Virgin Books, 1990.

External links

1859 births
1938 deaths
Hungarian male film actors
Hungarian male silent film actors
20th-century Hungarian male actors
Hungarian film directors
Hungarian male stage actors
People from Zalău